The New Rockford Post Office in New Rockford, North Dakota, United States, is a post office building that was built in 1939.  It was listed on the National Register of Historic Places in 1989 as U.S. Post Office-New Rockford.

It "was funded under the Emergency Construction Program Act of August 5, 1937 with an allocation of $85,000".

References

Government buildings completed in 1939
Post office buildings on the National Register of Historic Places in North Dakota
National Register of Historic Places in Eddy County, North Dakota
Stripped Classical architecture in the United States
1939 establishments in North Dakota